Sheykh Fazlolah-e Nuri Rural District is a rural district (dehestan) in Baladeh District, Nur County, Mazandaran Province, Iran. At the 2006 census, its population was 2,114, in 667 families. The rural district has 19 villages.

References 

Rural Districts of Mazandaran Province
Nur County